Alex, Alec or Alexander Hall may refer to:

People
Alexander William Hall (1838–1919), English Conservative politician
Alec Hall (Australian footballer) (1869–1953), Australian rules footballer
Alexander Hall (soccer) (1880–1943), Canadian soccer player
Alexander Hall (1894–1968), American film director, composer, and theater actor
Alex Hall (footballer, born 1908) (1908–1991), Scottish footballer
Alec Hall (English footballer) (1909–1992), English footballer
Alex Hall (actress) (born 1949), British actress
Alex Hall (American football) (born 1985), American football player 
Alex Hall (author) (born 1990), American author
Alex Hall (skier) (born 1998), American freestyle skier 
Alex Hall (baseball) (born 1999), Australian baseball player

Other uses
Alexander Hall and Sons, a shipbuilding company in Aberdeen, Scotland
Alexander Hall (Princeton University), an assembly hall at Princeton University